The word Glan meaning derives from Celtic (Noric) glanos meaning "bright, clear", cf. Glanis, Glanum, Glen and English "clean". Glan (Nahe)
 Glan, Sarangani, a municipality in Sarangani, Philippines
 Glan (Gurk), a river in Carinthia, Austria, tributary of the Gurk
 Glan (Nahe), a river in Rhineland-Palatinate, Germany, tributary of the Nahe
 Glan Cattle, a traditional cattle breed from the same area
 Glan (lake), a lake in Sweden near Norrköping
 Pentti Glan (1946–2017), Finnish-Canadian rock drummer

See also
 Glan Valley Railway, Rhineland-Palatinate, Germany
 Glane (disambiguation)